Filipo or Filipos is a given name and a surname. The following people have that name:
Surname
Ross Ami Filipo (born 1979), professional rugby union footballer
Given name
Filipo Archinto (1500–1558), an Italian theologian and diplomat. 
Filipo Lavea Levi (born 1979), a New Zealand-born Samoan rugby union footballer
Filipo Tirado (born 1949), a Puerto Rican puppeteer
Filipos Woldeyohannes, commander of Eritrea 's Operation Zone 2 Eritrea